Santokhgarh is a town and a Municipal Council, nagar panchayat in Una district in the Indian state of Himachal Pradesh.

Geography

People
The population is mix of Hindus and Sikhs but there are still a few Muslims.

Demographics
 India census, Santokhgarh had a population of 8,308. Males constitute 51% of the population and females 49%. Santokhgarh has an average literacy rate of 68%, higher than the national average of 59.5%: male literacy is 74%, and female literacy is 62%. In Santokhgarh, 13% of the population is under six years of age.

Temples

Santokhgarh has a number of temples, including Gurudwara Shaheeda Singhaa'n, Gurudwara Singh Sabha, Shri Baba Nanga Temple, temple of Vishvakarma, Shri Guru Ravidass Mandir, Gita Bhawan Mandir, Khawaja Mandir, Shani Dev Mandir, Hanuman Mandir, and Shiv Mandir.

References

Cities and towns in Una district